Port Moresby (Bomana) Cemetery is a Commonwealth War Graves Commission cemetery dating from World War II near Port Moresby, Papua New Guinea. The cemetery contains the graves of those who died in the fighting in the former Territory of Papua and on Bougainville Island. The remains of 3,824 Commonwealth soldiers, 699 of them unidentified are buried in the cemetery; as well two others: a Dutch citizen and one burial not related to the war.

Over 600 Indian soldiers who fought in the Second World War are buried at the cemetery.

Notable burials
 Artie Carnell (1909–1942), Australian rugby league footballer
 John Alexander French  (1914–1942), Australian recipient of the Victoria Cross
 Rex Julius (1914–1944), Australian official war artist
 Bruce Steel Kingsbury (1918–1942), Australian recipient of the Victoria Cross

References

External links
 

Commonwealth War Graves Commission cemeteries in Papua New Guinea